WMS (Watershed Modeling System) is a watershed computer simulation and modeling software application from Aquaveo. It was originally created in the early 1990s at the Engineering Computer Graphics Laboratory at Brigham Young University.

The software supports a number of hydraulic and hydrologic models that can be used to create drainage basin simulations.

Features
The Watershed Modeling System (WMS) is a proprietary water modeling software application used to develop watershed computer simulations. The software provides tools to automate various basic and advanced delineations, calculations, and modeling processes. It supports river hydraulic and storm drain models, lumped parameter, regression, 2D hydrologic modeling of watersheds, and can be used to model both water quantity and water quality. , supported models include HEC-1, HEC-RAS, HEC-HMS, TR-20, TR-55, NFF, Rational, MODRAT, HSPF, CE-QUAL-W2, GSSHA, SMPDBK, and other models.

History
WMS was initially developed by the Engineering Computer Graphics Laboratory at Brigham Young University in the early 1990s on Unix workstations. James Nelson, Norman Jones, and Woodruff Miller wrote a 1992 paper titled "Algorithm for Precise Drainage-Basin Delineation" that was published in the March 1994 issue of the Journal of Hydraulic Engineering. The paper described an algorithm that could be used to describe the flow of water in a drainage basin, thereby defining the drainage basin. 

The development of WMS was funded primarily by The United States Army Corps of Engineers (COE). In 1997, WMS was used by the COE to model runoff in the Sava River basin in Bosnia. The software was sold commercially by Environmental Modeling Systems.

It was later ported to Windows platforms in the mid 1990s. WMS 6.0 (2000) was the last supported version for HP-UX, IRIX, OSF/1, and Solaris platforms. Development of WMS was done by the Environmental Modeling Research Laboratory (EMRL) at Brigham Young University (BYU) until April 2007, when the main software development team at EMRL incorporated as Aquaveo. Royalties from the software are paid to the engineering department at BYU.

The planners of the 2002 Winter Olympics, held in Salt Lake City, Utah, used WMS software to simulate terrorist attacks on water infrastructure such as the Jordanelle Reservoir. A 2007 paper, "Demonstrating Floodplain Uncertainty Using Flood Probability Maps", used WMS to demonstrate a new method of floodplain mapping that included uncertainty in its calculations and results.

A 2011 study to identify areas with potential groundwater in the Sinai Peninsula was performed using WMS by Hossam H. Elewa and Atef A. Qaddah.  WMS was used in combination with the TOPAZ model by a group of researchers in 2012 to help determine the impact of land development on the tropical watershed in the Upper Bernam River Basin in Malaysia for the years 1989-1995. The study was done to find ways of preventing shortages of irrigation water and the occurrence of floods.

Due to water shortages in Iraq, a group of engineers used WMS to study ways to optimize water collection and storage.

Version history

See also
GMS (software)
SMS (hydrology software)

References

External links
WMS Help Wiki

1995 establishments in Utah
1995 software
Brigham Young University
Environmental engineering
Hydraulic engineering
Integrated hydrologic modelling
Physical geography
Scientific simulation software
Hydrology software